Damias scripta is a moth of the family Erebidae first described by Oswald Bertram Lower in 1902. It is found in Australia.

References

Damias
Moths described in 1902